Interface is the debut album by Dominion. It was released in 1996 on Peaceville Records.

Track listing
All songs written and arranged by Dominion.
  "Tears from the Stars"   – 4:15  
  "Millennium"  – 3:50  
  "Silhouettes"  – 4:50  
  "Alive?"  – 5:47  
  "Weaving Fear"  – 5:55  
  "The Voyage"  – 5:33  
  "Deep into Me"  – 4:22  
  "Impulse"  – 5:10  
  "Conspire to Be"  – 5:11  
  "Hollowvision"  – 5:44

Credits
 Michelle Richfield - vocals
 Mass Firth - vocals, guitar
 Arno Cagna - vocals, guitar
 Danny North - bass
 Bill Law - drums
 Aaron Stainthorpe - guest vocals on "Alive?"
  

Dominion (British band) albums
1996 debut albums
Albums with cover art by Dave McKean